Ljig is a town and municipality located in the Kolubara District of western Serbia. It has a population of 3,219 inhabitants, while the municipality has a total of 12,730 inhabitants.

It is surrounded by Mount Rajac and Mount Rudnik.

History
The recorded history of the Ljig settlement itself begins in 1911, when a railroad was built between Lajkovac and Gornji Milanovac. The area, however, has a long history. The Dići church was founded by Serbian nobleman Vlgdrag, who was buried here in 1327. The ruins of the medieval Vavedenje Monastery include impressive sarcophagi dating from the 15th century, believed to belong to the Serbian despots Stefan Branković and Đurađ Branković. According to legend, Djuradj's wife, Jerina, was buried there as well.

An early reference to "Ljig" can be found in the 17th century records of Evliya Çelebi, which describe "LIGmehri" (the Ljig River) rising from Kara Dag in the village Baht (today's Ba) and flowing into the Kolubara River near Valjevo.  No settlement in the area was known to the Austrians when they occupied Serbia from 1717 to 1739. By 1818, however, the nearby settlement Gukosi had grown to 50 homes.

A railway station was built in 1917 near the present-day center of Ljig.  This lower area under the Gukoši hill includes a small settlement with a municipal court, school, inn, two stores, two textile mills, three tailors and several houses, and when still part of Gukoši had been referred to as the area "on the Ljig River."

During World War I, the Battle of Kolubara was fought nearby, making this area significant in history of Serbia and of war, and in military science. A monument memorializing the battle has been erected on Rajac Mountain.

Ljig separated from Gukoši in 1922, and by 1930 a school, health center and church were built. Prior to that time, Ljig residents had worshipped in Moravci.

Settlements
The town of Ljig is the economic and cultural center of the municipality with a primary school founded in 1907, a high school, a public library with a cinema, a health center and a post office.

Aside from the town of Ljig, the following settlements are part of municipality of Ljig:

 Ivanovci
 Kozelj
 Lalinci
 Veliševac
 Babajić
 Ba
 Kadina Luka
 Kalanjevci
 Jajčić
 Liplje
 Moravci
 Štavica
 Gukoš
 Milavac
 Brančić
 Poljanice
 Latković
 Slavkovica
 Paležnica
 Belanovica
 Bošnjanović
 Donji Banjani
 Dići
 Cvetanovac
 Živkovci 
 Šutci

Demographics

According to the 2011 census results, the municipality of Ljig has 12,754 inhabitants.

Ethnic groups
The ethnic composition of the municipality:

Economy
The following table gives a preview of total number of registered people employed in legal entities per their core activity (as of 2018):

Gallery

Notes and references
Notes
 "Plum brandy, the Internet and the world", European Agency for Reconstruction press release on Ljig
 2002 Serbian National Census

References

External links

 

Populated places in Kolubara District
Šumadija
Municipalities and cities of Šumadija and Western Serbia